is a Japanese voice actress. She is part of 81 Produce. Kumiko is famous for her role in the Rockman.EXE series as Netto Hikari.

Filmography

Anime
Best Student Council (TV) as Sachiko Iijima (ep 4)
Bokurano (TV) as Maki Ano
D.Gray-man (TV) as Daisya Barry (Youth) (ep 37)
Futakoi (TV) as Young Yuuya (ep 6)
Geneshaft (TV) as Mika Seidou
Gintama (TV) as Haji (eps 84-85)
Cardfight!! Vanguard as Eiji Saga
Haibane Renmei (TV) as Dai
Hamtaro as Marron
Jagainu-kun (TV) as Satoinu (Boartato)
Kyo kara Maoh! (TV) as Raven (young)
Machine Robo Rescue (TV) as Shou Ashigawa; Haruka Suzusaki
MÄR (TV) as Ginta Toramizu (eps 90-102); Burube (eps 15-16)
Mirmo! (TV) as Etsumi; Peter
My-Otome (TV) as Irina Woods
My-Otome Zwei (OAV) as Irina Woods
Nanami-chan (TV) as Kemario; Student
Nodame Cantabile (TV) as Makiko Tanaka
PaRappa the Rapper (TV) as Ghost/Monster (ep 12)
Pocket Monsters Advanced Generation the Movie: Deoxys the Visitor (movie) as Minun
Pocket Monsters: Advanced Generation (TV) as Minun (eps 38, 52)
Rockman.EXE (TV) as Netto Hikari
Rockman.EXE Axess (TV) as Netto Hikari
Rockman.EXE Stream (TV) as Netto Hikari
Rockman.EXE: Hikari to Yami no Program (movie) as Netto Hikari
Rockman.EXE Beast (TV) as Netto Hikari
Rockman.EXE Beast+ (TV) as Netto Hikari
Sky Girls (TV) as Ranko Mikogami
Spider Riders (TV) as Prince Lumen; Portia
Spider Riders: Yomigaeru Taiyou (TV) as Prince Lumen; Portia; [+ unlisted credits]
Tactical Roar (TV) as Manatsu Akoya
Tantei Shounen Kageman (TV) as Mario
Tsubasa: Reservoir Chronicle (TV) as Nokoru; Secret Agents (ep 9)
Uta Kata (TV) as Eri (ep 3)
Zoids/ZERO (TV) as Kelly Tasker
Pandora Hearts as Phillipe

Games
Wild Arms XF as Weishelt
Mega Man Network Transmission as Lan Hikari
Saru! Get You! SaruSaru Big Mission as Hikaru

Tokusatsu
Mahou Sentai Magiranger as Mandora Boy

Dubbing
Thomas the Tank Engine and Friends as Thomas the Tank Engine (Succeeding Keiko Toda)

References

81 Produce profile

1978 births
Living people
Japanese voice actresses
Voice actresses from Osaka
81 Produce voice actors